Daniel Harvey Hill Jr. (1859–1924) was an American educator and the third chancellor of North Carolina State University. D. H. Hill Library on NCSU's campus is named in his honor.

Early life

Hill was born in 1859 in Davidson, NC to Confederate General Daniel Harvey Hill. Hill Jr. received his bachelor's and master's degrees from Davidson College in 1880 and 1886, respectively.

Career 
Hill began working as a professor of English and bookkeeping at North Carolina College of Agriculture and Mechanic Arts, now North Carolina State University, in 1889. A few years later, in 1909, the college Board of Trustees elected Hill the third president. During Hill's tenure, college enrollment grew to more than 700 students.

North Carolina State University's D. H. Hill Library was named for former President Hill, who served as the college's librarian after his retirement from the presidency in 1916. NCSU Libraries Special Collections Research Center serves as the repository for President Hill's manuscript collection.

Death 
Hill died in 1924 in Blowing Rock, North Carolina.

References

Further reading
Daniel Harvey Hill Jr. in Biographical history of North Carolina from colonial times to the present, by Samuel A'Court Ashe, Ed. Greensboro, N. C.: Charles L. Van Noppen, 1908.

People from Davidson, North Carolina
Chancellors of North Carolina State University
Daniel Hill family
1859 births
1924 deaths